Allan Karlsson (January 23, 1911 – April 6, 1991) was a Swedish cross-country skier who competed in the 1930s. He won a bronze medal in the 4 × 10 km relay at the 1934 FIS Nordic World Ski Championships in Sollefteå.

Cross-country skiing results

World Championships

External links
World Championship results 

1911 births
1991 deaths
Swedish male cross-country skiers
FIS Nordic World Ski Championships medalists in cross-country skiing
20th-century Swedish people